3D Brick Breaker Revolution is a game for iOS and Windows Phone 7 developed by Digital Chocolate and released on March 27, 2009 for iOS. The game was ported to Windows Phone 7 and released on December 1, 2010. The Windows Phone 7 version offers Leaderboard and Achievement support as a title for Xbox Live-enabled games.

Gameplay

Brick Breaker Revolution 3D is an Arkanoid style game where players destroy bricks and boss battles using weapons and a ball. There are three game modes: classic mode, revolution mode, and time attack. The game features power-ups that are collected as they drop down the screen during levels. The game features a difficulty level, this level increases after every boss battle depending on the player's skill.

References

External links
Official Website

2009 video games
Digital Chocolate games
IOS games
Video games developed in the United States
Windows Phone games
Breakout clones
Single-player video games